Alexander Lindsay, 2nd Earl of Crawford (c. 1387–1438/1439) was a Scottish magnate. He was the son of David Lindsay, 1st Earl of Crawford and Elizabeth Stewart, daughter of King Robert II and Euphemia de Ross. He was knighted at the coronation of King James I on 21 May 1424, and subsequently was one of the hostages for King James given over to the English from 1424 until November 1427.

Family

He married Marjorie whose parentage is as yet unknown, although she is theorized by some to have been a daughter of the Earl of Dunbar, and had issue.

 David Lindsay, 3rd Earl of Crawford, who succeeded his father as Earl.
 Elizabeth, who was dispensed to marry William Douglas of Lochleven (d. 1420/1). This marriage evidently never took place
 Christian, who first married William Douglas of Lochleven (evidently in lieu of her sister) by whom she had at least a son Alexander, and a daughter Elizabeth who married Richard Lovel of Ballumbie. She married secondly David Wemyss of that Ilk (d. 1430), by whom she was the mother of John Wemyss of that Ilk and two daughters, Helen and Euphemia. She married lastly Sir James Auchinleck of that Ilk (d. 1449), by whom she was the mother of Sir John Auchinleck of that Ilk (d. 1502) among others

References

1380s births
1430s deaths
2
Alexander

Year of birth uncertain
Year of death uncertain